Jävre is a locality in Piteå Municipality, Norrbotten County, Sweden, with 576 inhabitants in 2010.

References

External links

Populated places in Piteå Municipality
Norrbotten